The Tennis Club Weissenhof is a tennis complex in Stuttgart, Germany. 
The complex's tenant is MercedesCup.

See also
 List of tennis stadiums by capacity

References

External links 

Tennis venues in Germany
Sport in Stuttgart
Sports venues in Baden-Württemberg
Tennis clubs